Thomas Eugene Everhart FREng (born February 15, 1932, Kansas City, Missouri) is an American educator and physicist. His area of expertise is the physics of electron beams.  Together with Richard F. M. Thornley he designed the Everhart–Thornley detector. These detectors are still in use in scanning electron microscopes, even though the first such detector was made available as early as 1956.

Everhart was elected a member of the National Academy of Engineering in 1978 for contributions to the electron optics of the scanning electron microscope and to its use in electronics and biology. He was appointed an International Fellow of the Royal Academy of Engineering in 1990. He served as chancellor of the University of Illinois at Urbana-Champaign from  1984 to 1987 and as the president of the California Institute of Technology from 1987 to 1997.

Early life and education
Everhart's parents were William E. Everhart and Elizabeth A. West. Everhart received his A.B. in physics from Harvard University in 1953, and his M.S. in applied physics from the University of California, Los Angeles in 1955.  He held a Marshall Scholarship at Clare College, University of Cambridge, where he completed a PhD in Physics under Professor Charles Oatley in 1958.

Career

Everhart-Thornley detector 

Everhart began working on electron detection and the design of scanning electron microscopes (SEMs) as a student with Charles Oatley at Cambridge in 1955. An initial prototype, the SEM1, had been developed by Dennis McMullen, who published his dissertation Investigations relating to the design of electron microscopes in 1952. It was further modified by Ken C. A. Smith, who developed a way to efficiently detect low-energy secondary electrons. Oatley and his students used SEM to develop a variety of new techniques for studying surface topography.

Everhart developed techniques to detect low-energy secondaries. His Ph.D. thesis, in 1958, was Contrast formation in the scanning electron microscope. Analyzing the electrons detected by the SEM, he reported that about 67% of the signal measured could be attributed to low energy secondaries from the specimen. About 3% was due to higher-energy reflected electrons. He also presented equations to model the noise introduced.

Use of the term "voltage contrast" to describe the relationship between the voltage applied to a specimen and the resulting image contrast, is attributed to Everhart. As of 1959, Everhart produced the first voltage-contrast images of p-n junctions of biased silicon diodes. Voltage contrast, the ability to detect variations in surface electrical potentials on a specimen, is now one of several imaging modes used for the characterization, diagnosis and failure analysis of semiconductors. As many as half of the SEMs sold are believed to be used in semiconductor applications.

Everhart studied contrast mechanisms in detail and developed a new theory of reflection of electrons from solids. He also made some of the first quantitative studies of the effects of beam penetration on image formation in the SEM.

In 1960 Everhart and Richard F. M. Thornley published a description for the improved design of a secondary electron detector, since known as the Everhart–Thornley detector. Everhart and Thornley increased the efficiency of existing detectors by adding a light pipe to carry the photon signal from the scintillator inside the evacuated specimen chamber of the scanning electron microscopes to the photomultiplier outside the chamber.  This strengthened the signal collected and improved the signal-to-noise ratio. In 1963, Pease and Nixon incorporated the Everhart-Thornley detector into their prototype for the first commercial SEM, later developed as the Cambridge Scientific Instruments Mark I  Stereoscan. This type of secondary electron and back-scattered electron detector is still used in modern scanning electron microscopes (SEMs).

By using various types of detectors with SEM, it becomes possible to map the topography, crystallography and composition of specimens being examined. In the 1960s, Wells, Everhart, and Matta built an advanced SEM for semiconductor studies and microfabrication at Westinghouse Laboratories in Pittsburgh. They were able to combine signals so to more effectively examine multiple layers in active devices, an early example of EBIC imaging.

University of California, Berkeley 
From 1958-1978 Everhart was a professor and latterly department chairman of engineering and computer science, at the University of California at Berkeley.  There he supported the construction of the first scanning electron microscope in a U.S. university.

Cornell University 
In January 1979, he became Joseph Silbert Dean of the College of Engineering at Cornell University, Ithaca, New York.

University of Illinois 
Everhart served as chancellor of the University of Illinois at Urbana-Champaign from  1984 to 1987. As chancellor, Everhart was involved in proposals for and development of the Beckman Institute for Advanced Science and Technology, an interdisciplinary research institute substantially funded by an appeal to Arnold Orville Beckman. In a formal invitation to proposed members of the Administrative Committee for the Beckman Institute, Everhart wrote that creation of the Beckman Institute was "an exceptional opportunity, perhaps the most dramatic and exciting one that we will see in our working lifetimes."

California Institute of Technology 
Everhart was president of the California Institute of Technology from 1987 to 1997. As Caltech's president, Everhart authorized the Laser Interferometer Gravitational-Wave Observatory (LIGO) project, a large-scale experiment that seeks to detect gravitational waves and use them for fundamental research in physics and astronomy.

While at Caltech, Everhart was involved in substantial expansion of the university, heading a $350-million fund-raising drive. In 1989, he helped dedicate the Beckman Institute at Caltech, a research center for biology, chemistry, and related sciences. It was the second of five research centers supported by Arnold Orville Beckman and his wife Mabel.  Everhart also was involved in the development of the W. M. Keck Observatory in Hawaii, supported by the W. M. Keck Foundation; the Gordon and Betty Moore Laboratory of Engineering, supported by Gordon Moore of Intel;  and the Fairchild Engineering Library, supported by the Sherman Fairchild Foundation.

Everhart promoted efforts to hire more female faculty and increase the enrollment of women. In his final year at Caltech the number of women in the freshmen class was double that of the year he joined Caltech.

Since 1998, Everhart has served as a trustee of the California Institute of Technology.  He sits on the boards of directors of Raytheon and the Kavli Foundation, among others.

Harvard University 
In 1999, Everhart was elected to a six-year terms as Overseer of Harvard University. In 2001 he became a member of the Overseers executive committee.  He was one of three overseers who participated in the university's presidential search committee in 2000-01.  In 2004, he was elected president of Harvard's Board of Overseers for 2004-05.

Awards and honors 
Everhart has been elected to a number of scientific societies, including the following:

 1969, 	Fellow, Institute of Electrical and Electronics Engineers
 1978, 	Member, National Academy of Engineering
 1984, 	Scientific Member, Böhmische Physical Society
 1988, 	Fellow, American Association for the Advancement of Sciences
 1990, 	Foreign Member, Royal Academy of Engineering

Everhart has received a number of awards, including the following:

1984, IEEE Centennial Medal
1992, Clark Kerr Award 
1993, ASEE Centennial Medallion
2002, IEEE Founders Medal 
2002, Okawa Prize

References

External links

 
 

 

1932 births
Living people
Presidents of the California Institute of Technology
21st-century American physicists
Marshall Scholars
Members of the United States National Academy of Engineering
Harvard College alumni
UC Berkeley College of Engineering faculty
Cornell University faculty
IEEE Centennial Medal laureates
Fellow Members of the IEEE
Leaders of the University of Illinois
Physicists from Missouri
Scientists from Missouri